The Virginia militia is an armed force composed of all citizens of the Commonwealth of Virginia capable of bearing arms.  The Virginia militia was established in 1607 as part of the English militia system. Militia service in Virginia was compulsory for all free males. The main purpose of the Crown's militia was to repel invasions and insurrections and to enforce the laws of the colony.

17th and early 18th century
In 1623, the year following the outbreak of the first major Anglo-Powhatan War in Virginia, the Virginia General Assembly commanded, "that men go not to work in the ground without their arms; That no man go or send abroad without a sufficient partie well armed." In 1661 Governor William Berkeley stated, "All our freemen are bound to be trained every month in their particular counties." The British county lieutenant system was employed as the population grew; each county had a lieutenant, appointed as the county's chief militia officer.

The militia system was originally used to defend against Native American tribes in the tidewater area. As the slave population grew in the Virginia Colony, the militia played a role in keeping slaves from running away or from revolting – through the use of militia patrollers. This Virginia militia system was put to the test in 1676 during Bacon's Rebellion. The Crown's militia was victorious over Nathaniel Bacon, who tried to seize power.

Virginia militia under the command of Colonel James Patton fought an Iroquois war party at the Battle of Galudoghson in December 1742. This was the first military action between Virginia soldiers and Native Americans in western Virginia.

French and Indian War

During the French and Indian War (1754–1763), a formal act came into effect.

Four companies of Virginia militia participated in the Sandy Creek Expedition in February 1756, however the expedition was forced to turn back due to harsh weather and lack of food.

In September 1756, Colonel George Washington was unsuccessful in raising a militia in Augusta County to attack the active Indian warriors on the Jackson River. Militia were required to man a series of strategically sited forts on the Virginia frontier.

Revolutionary War

In 1774, revolution was at Virginia's doorstep when Royal Governor Lord Dunmore dissolved the Virginia House of Burgesses because of their support of the city of Boston against the closing of the Port of Boston by Lord North.  On May 15, 1776, the Virginia General Assembly voted unanimously for independence and to have a declaration of rights drawn up. Colonel George Mason became the principal author of the Virginia Declaration of Rights which was published on June 12, 1776. Mason drew from his own previous writings upon his founding of the Fairfax County Independent Company of Volunteers on September 21, 1774. This company was a paramilitary organization independent of the Crown's militia. Article 13 of the Virginia Declaration of Rights which established the militia clause as a fundamental right was based upon three solid English rights: the right to revolution, the right to group self-preservation and the right to self-defense. Under Article 13 of the Virginia Declaration of Rights he wrote:

Shortly after the Revolutionary War began, Kentucky County, Virginia was organized with George Rogers Clark as head of its local militia.  Clark asked Governor Patrick Henry  for permission to lead a secret expedition to capture the nearest British posts, which were located in the Illinois country. Governor Henry commissioned Clark as a lieutenant colonel and authorized him to raise troops for the expedition.  The Illinois campaign began in July 1778, when Clark and about 175 men crossed the Ohio River at Fort Massac and marched to Kaskaskia, taking it on the night of July 4. Cahokia, Vincennes, and several other villages and forts in British territory were subsequently captured without firing a shot, because most of the French-speaking and American Indian inhabitants were unwilling to take up arms on behalf of the British. To counter Clark's advance, Henry Hamilton reoccupied Vincennes with a small force. In February 1779, Clark returned to Vincennes in a surprise winter expedition and retook the town, capturing Hamilton in the process. The winter expedition was Clark's most significant military achievement.

Present-day system
The Virginia militia system, as a compulsory service composed of the body of the people trained to arms as envisioned by George Mason, remained intact until the end of the American Civil War. Reconstruction governments forced upon Virginia an all-volunteer militia system in opposition to Virginia's Bill of Rights. The militia became statutorily composed of the volunteer and the unorganized militia.

In 1971, the Virginia Bill of Rights under Article I, Section 13, was changed to the following by popular vote

That a well regulated militia, composed of the body of the people, trained to arms, is the proper, natural, and safe defense of a free state, therefore, the right of the people to keep and bear arms shall not be infringed; that standing armies, in time of peace, should be avoided as dangerous to liberty; and that in all cases the military should be under strict subordination to, and governed by, the civil power.

Twentieth Century and the Present
The current Virginia Militia under Virginia Code states § 44-1. Composition of militia.

The militia of the Commonwealth of Virginia shall consist of all able-bodied residents of the Commonwealth who are citizens of the United States and all other able-bodied persons resident in the Commonwealth who have declared their intention to become citizens of the United States, who are at least 16 years of age and, except as hereinafter provided, not more than 55 years of age. The militia shall be divided into three classes: the National Guard, which includes the Army National Guard and the Air National Guard; the Virginia Defense Force; and the unorganized militia.The Code of Virginia, Section 44-117 states, "The officers of the Virginia Military Institute, the Virginia Women's Institute for Leadership at Mary Baldwin College, the Fishburne Military School, the Massanutten Military Academy, and the Commandant of Cadets and Assistant Commandants of Cadets of the Virginia Polytechnic Institute and State University shall be commissioned officers of the Virginia militia, unorganized, and subject to the orders of the Governor and the same rules and regulations as to discipline provided for other commissioned officers of the military organizations of the Commonwealth." Permanent faculty members of the Virginia Military Institute (VMI) are normally offered commissions in the naval or unorganized militia of Virginia. The Superintendent of VMI is normally a Lieutenant General of the unorganized Virginia militia unless the superintendent is a regular US military officer of higher rank. The corps of cadets also serves as cadet members of the unorganized militia. Staff members of the Virginia Tech Corps of Cadets also may hold officer appointments in the Virginia Militia, unless they hold higher rank as active or retired US military officers.

See also
Militia
Militia (United States)
Virginia Regiment
Virginia Defense Force

Notes

External links
Virginia Defense Force Official Website
Virginia1774.org
VirginiaMilitia.com
Virginia State Militia on Facebook
VirginiaIndependentMilitia.com

 
1607 establishments in Virginia